Petasactis is a genus of moths belonging to the family Tineidae. It contains only one species, Petasactis technica, which is endemic to New Zealand. This species has not been collected since prior to 1888.  It is classified as "Data Deficient" by the Department of Conservation.

Taxonomy 
This genus was described by Edward Meyrick in 1915. The species was also described by Edward Meyrick in 1888 and named Ereunetis technica using a female specimen he collected at Whangarei Heads in December. In 1915 Meyrick reassigned this species to the genus Petasactis when he revised New Zealand Tineina. George Hudson discussed this species in his 1928 book The Butterflies and Moths of New Zealand. The holotype specimen is held at the Natural History Museum, London.

Description 
Meyrick described the species as follows:

Distribution 
This species is endemic to New Zealand. This species is only known to be present at its type locality.

Biology and behaviour 
The biology of this species is largely unknown. Adult moths are on the wing in December.

Host species 
It has been hypothesised that P. technica larva inhabit and consume dead leaves of large monocots or dead wood.

Conservation status 
This species has been classified as having the "Data Deficient" conservation status under the New Zealand Threat Classification System. It has not been collected since Meyrick obtained the type specimen.

References

External links

Image of type specimen of Petasactis technica

Tineidae
Monotypic moth genera
Moths of New Zealand
Endemic fauna of New Zealand
Taxa named by Edward Meyrick
Moths described in 1888
Tineidae genera
Endemic moths of New Zealand